Birstall is a large village and civil parish within the Charnwood borough of Leicestershire, England. It is three miles north of Leicester city centre and is part of the wider Leicester Urban Area.

It is the largest village in Charnwood, with a population only marginally lower than the neighbouring town of Syston at the 2001 census.

The village

Birstall lies on the A6 and is the last major settlement before Leicester when arriving from the north. Birstall thus forms part of the Leicester Urban Area. The village centre lies just off the A6, along Sibson Road. The village contains two supermarkets, a garden centre and a variety of other shops. There are a number of schools, including Highcliffe Primary School, Riverside Primary School, Hallam Fields Primary School and The Cedars Academy. The village contains the Church of St James the Great, Birstall, the St Teresa Roman Catholic church and Birstall Methodist Church.

There is a large housing estate in the north-west of the village, leading off Greengate Lane.

The Grand Union Canal runs along the eastern side of the  village, which is adjacent to Watermead Country Park, a series of lakes in the bottom of the Soar Valley, which have been set aside as a recreational area and country park.

The Great Central Railway steam railway has its southern terminus near the village, where the A6 meets the Leicester outer ringroad at Red Hill Circle.  Just north of Red Hill Circle, and west of the A6, is Red Hill filling station, which became a Grade II listed building in 2012.  The railway also forms the boundary of the southern end of Birstall Golf Club.

To the north of the village, the A6 meets the A46 Leicester Western Bypass and then continues on towards Loughborough along the Soar Valley.

The symbol of Birstall is a Cedar tree. The original tree stands in Roman Road. It was once in the grounds of the now demolished Birstall Hall.

The local Air Training Corps unit is 1947(Birstall) Squadron.

History

The village's name means 'settlement built on the site of a fortification'.

Saxon remnants have been found in the village and surrounding area. The village was called Burstalle in the Domesday Book when it belonged to Hugh de Grandmesnil. The village was a small one until the arrival of the Great Central Railway in 1899. From then onwards development has continued and still continues to-day. Between 1901 and the 2001 the population grew from 611 to over 11,000.

Hallam Fields

A new housing development called 'Hallam Fields' commenced construction in 2006 and was well advanced by 2008. It occupies land to the west of the A6, between the 'Gates' estate and the A46. The development will take ten years to complete, consisting of up to 900 properties including schools, shops, offices, industrial units and a fire station. It has been described as a mini Poundbury. By April 2010 it had 11 streets. These are Archdale Close, Bridge Green, Dale Close, Far Pastures Road, Halfpenny Close, Hallam Fields Road, Little Connery Lees, Pinfold Close, Brook Furlong Drive, Palmer Square and Lady Augusta Road. North of the development, on the roundabout connecting the A46 and A6 is a new service area with a KFC, a Shell petrol station and an Ibis Budget.

Places and buildings within the village
Schools:
Highcliffe primary school
Riverside primary school
Hallam fields primary school
The Cedars Academy

Note: Longslade Community College and Stonehill high school merged to become Cedars Academy

Shops:
One main supermarket 
One garden centre
Various shops along Sibson road

Community facilities:
Library on Wanlip Lane
Parish Council offices

Parks:
Watermead Country Park
School Lane recreational park
Harrogate park

Golf club:
Birstall Golf Club - founded in 1901 - one of the first golf clubs in Leicestershire

Pubs / clubs
Birstall has 3 pubs and 3 social clubs. The White Horse Pub dates from the time the canal was constructed

Transport
The main village areas of Wanlip Lane and Harrowgate Drive are served by Centrebus service 22A while the A6 corridor is served by buses between Leicester and Loughborough operated by Kinchbus service 2 (until 4 September 2022), Skylink and Arriva Midlands services 126 and 127.

The Birstall Park and Ride service is at the northern end of the village and is operated by Roberts Travel Group.

Neighbouring villages
The closest village to Birstall is Wanlip, a smaller village, with the village of Rothley being the next closest. The villages of Thurmaston and Syston are also nearby as well as Thurcaston. Birstall shares its southern border with the City of Leicester.

Twin towns
 Rixensart, Walloon Brabant, Belgium

References

Villages in Leicestershire
Civil parishes in Leicestershire
Borough of Charnwood